Rodney Allen Arrants (September 5, 1944 – February 21, 2021) was an American actor. 

Arrants was born in Los Angeles, California, on September 5, 1944. He acted on the daytime programs The Young and the Restless, Another World, Days of Our Lives and Search for Tomorrow, on which he played the wealthy Travis Tourneur Sentell. He also co-starred with Joanna Kerns in the 1976 film A*P*E. He was married to actress Patricia Estrin (whom he met while playing brother and sister, Austin and Megan Cushing on the short-lived soap, Lovers and Friends).

Arrants was married to Beverle Bava from 1965 until they divorced in 1976 and to Patricia Estrin from 1979 until 1992, when they divorced.

Arrants appeared on the cover of the August 11, 1979 issue of TV Guide.

He died on February 21, 2021, at the age of 76.

Filmography

Film

Television

References

External links 
 

1944 births
2021 deaths
American male film actors
American male television actors